Russel David Kevin Van Dulken (born November 14, 1999), better known as Twistzz, is a Canadian professional Counter-Strike: Global Offensive player for FaZe Clan. He has previously played for top teams such as Team SoloMid, Misfits and Team Liquid. Twistzz was named the MVP of ESL One New York 2018  and IEM Sydney 2019 by HLTV.

Early life 
Twistzz was born on November 14, 1999. He began playing video games with his dad and his first FPS game was Quake. After his father moved away, Twistzz started playing games for longer periods of time. Twistzz and his mom eventually moved in with her boyfriend and Twistzz started playing Counter-Strike: Global Offensive (CS:GO). His mom's boyfriend started verbally abusing Twistzz which stalled his progress in CS:GO. In 2014 his mom chose to leave her boyfriend and Twistzz was able to make progress in CS:GO once again. His mom was supportive of him playing CS:GO because she was aware of where he was at all times.

Career

2015 
Twistzz joined his first professional team Tectonic in October 2015.  In December 2015, Twistzz joined SapphireKelownaDotCom along with veteran In-Game Leader Kyle "OCEAN" O'Brien.  SapphireKelownaDotCom were signed by AGG in February 2016. Even at this early stage people would start seeing that he is a promising up-and-comer.

2016 
In March, team AGG released their roster and Twistzz joined team KKona with his ex-AGG teammates for 1 week before receiving a stand-in offer from his first large organization, Team SoloMid (TSM), along with another veteran In-Game Leader Sean Gares. Eventually, Twistzz was signed by TSM on a permanent basis.

2017
In January, TSM released Twistzz along with his teammates allowing Misfits Gaming to pick up the roster. In April, Twistzz joined Team Liquid (Liquid) after the departure of Jacob "Pimp" Winneche. On Liquid, Twistzz and Liquid placed 2nd at two big events, ESL One New York 2017 and ESG Tour Mykonos. In November Twistzz's Liquid won the Americas Minor Championship for ELEAGUE Boston 2017.

2018
In January, Twistzz's Liquid placed 14th at the ELEAGUE Major: Boston 2018 with their coach Wilton "zews" Prado standing in for Lucas "steel" Lopes, due to roster-lock rules at the time.  In February Twistzz's Liquid beat Cloud9 in the finals to win cs_summit 2, which would be their first win at an event in 2018.

In April, Twistzz's Liquid ESL Pro League Season 7 final. Liquid continued to place 2nd against Astralis at the ECS Season 5 Finals and ELEAGUE Season Premier 2018.

In the second major of 2018, The FACEIT London Major, his performances helped Liquid secure 1st place in the new challenger's stage by going 3-0. Twistzz achieved a Performance Rating 2.0 of 1.47 against HellRaisers which Liquid won 16-9 and an even more impressive Performance Rating 2.0 of 1.54 against Vega Squadron in which Liquid won in Overtime 19–17 in the New Challenger's Stage.

Going into the New Legends Stage, Team Liquid would go 3–0, beating Winstrike, where Liquid won 16–7, Twistzz achieving his most impressive Performance Rating 2.0 in the tournament of 1.79. This would be followed by a 16–10 win over NIP, Twistzz getting a Performance Rating 2.0 of 1.44. Team Liquid would then go onto beat HLTV's #1 Rated team at the time, Astralis 19–15, Twistzz having a quiet Performance Rating 2.0 of 1.06.

The next stage of the FACEIT London Major was The Playoffs. Liquid would face HellRaisers yet again winning 2–1 with Twistzz amounting to a Performance Rating 2.0 of 1.16, going through into the Semi Finals of the second Major of 2018. Liquid would go up against Astralis in the Semi Final, this time losing 2–0, going out of the Major. However Twistzz would still get a Performance Rating 2.0 of 0.92.

After the FACEIT London Major, Twistzz and Liquid would go on to place 2nd at ESL One New York 2018 (Twistzz receiving the MVP award), IEM Chicago 2018 and at the ESL Pro League Season 8 Finals. However, Liquid would win SuperNova CS:GO Malta which did have the caveat of not having Astralis in attendance and was not considered a High Tier tournament.

2019
In January, HLTV named Twistzz the 12th best professional player of 2018. Liquid were finally able to beat their rival Astralis in a best of 3 final at the iBUYPOWER Masters 2019 tournament. Team Liquid would place 5th-8th at the major, losing to the underdogs ENCE in the quarterfinals.  In May, at IEM Sydney 2019, Liquid went undefeated and secured 1st place, and Twistzz won his first big event.  Twistzz was named MVP at this event and had an average HLTV rating of 1.25. In June, Liquid won DreamHack Masters Dallas 2019 and the ESL Pro League Season 9 Finals, beating their rivals Astralis in the round of 6.  At ESL One Cologne 2019 Liquid won the Intel Grand Slam worth $1 million in addition to the tournament itself.  Despite Team Liquid coming into the Starladder Berlin Major as heavy favorites, they scraped out of the group stage 3–2, and lost to Astralis in the quarterfinals.

2021

In January, Twistzz joined FaZe Clan, replacing Kjaerbye⁠. Twistzz had mostly mediocre results for the rest of 2021 with FaZe Clan other than an impressive showing at IEM Cologne 2021, finishing in a respectable 3rd-4th position in the first CS:GO LAN event since the start of the COVID-19 pandemic

2022
In January, HLTV named Twistzz the 17th best professional player of 2021.
Going into 2022, FaZe Clan removed long time player Olof "olofmeister" Kajbjer in favour of four-time HLTV Top 20 player, Robin "ropz" Kool. Following the addition, Twistzz and FaZe got off to a hot start, finishing 1st-4th in the BLAST Premier Spring Groups, advancing to the Spring Finals, 1st in IEM Katowice 2022 and 1st in ESL Pro League Season 15. In May, Twistzz won his first Major championship at the PGL Major Antwerp 2022, making him the second North American player (other than Stewie2K) to win both a Major championship and an Intel Grand Slam in his career to date. After two disappointing results post-Major, the Faze team played in the online Roobet Cup, where they finished second, losing to BIG Clan. After the successful Roobet Cup run, which was used to enlarge Faze's map pool, the team went into IEM Cologne as favourites despite dropping to the #2 team in the world by HLTV. They would meet #1 ranked Natus Vincere, where Faze won 3-2 (On Maps), becoming the first team in CS:GO history to win all 3 of: IEM Katowice, The Major, IEM Cologne in one year.

Tournament results

2018
 cs_summit 2 - 1st
IEM Katowice 2018 - 3/4th
ESL Pro League Season 7 Finals - 2nd
ECS Season 5 Finals - 2nd
ELEAGUE CS:GO Premier 2018 - 2nd
FACEIT London Major - 3/4th
ESL One New York 2018 - 2nd
EPICENTER 2018 - 3/4th
IEM Chicago 2018 - 2nd
 SuperNova CS:GO Malta - 1st
ESL Pro League Season 8 Finals - 2nd

2019
 iBUYPOWER Masters 2019 - 1st
 IEM Sydney 2019 - 1st
 DreamHack Masters Dallas 2019 - 1st
 ESL Pro League Season 9 - 1st
 ESL One Cologne 2019 - 1st
 BLAST Pro Series Los Angeles 2019 - 1st
 IEM Chicago 2019 - 1st
StarLadder Major: Berlin 2019 - 5-8th
 ESL One New-York 2019 - 3-4th
 DreamHack Masters Malmö 2019 - 9-12th
 BLAST Pro Series Copenhagen 2019 - 5th
 ECS Season 8 Finals - 2nd
 ESL Pro League Season 10 Finals - 5th-6th 
 BLAST Global Final 2019 - 2nd

2020
 IEM Katowice 2020 - 5th-6th
 ESL Pro League Season 11 North America - 1st
 ESL One: Road To Rio North America - 4th
 Dreamhack Masters Spring 2020 North America - 2nd
 BLAST Premier Spring 2020 Americas Finals - 4th
 cs_summit 6 North America - 3rd
 Dreamhack Open Summer 2020 North America - 2nd
 ESL One Cologne 2020 North America - 2nd
 ESL Pro League Season 12 North America - 4th
 IEM New York 2020 North America - 5th
 IEM Beijing-Haidian 2020 North America - 3rd-4th
 Dreamhack Masters Winter 2020 Europe - 13th-16th
 IEM Global Challenge 2020 - 2nd

2021
 IEM Katowice 2021 - 9th-12th
 ESL Pro League Season 13 - 17th-20th
 Dreamhack Masters Spring 2021 - 13th-16th
 Flashpoint 3 - 13th-16th
 BLAST Premier Spring Final - 7th-8th
 IEM Cologne 2021 - 3rd-4th
 ESL Pro League Season 14 - 13th-14th
 IEM Fall 2021 Europe - 9th
 PGL Major Stockholm 2021 - 9th-11th
 BLAST Premier Fall Final - 5th-6th
 IEM Winter 2021 - 9th-12th

2022
 BLAST Premier Spring Groups 2022 - 1st-3rd
 IEM Katowice 2022 - 1st
 ESL Pro League Season 15 - 1st
 PGL Major Antwerp 2022: European RMR A - 3rd
 PGL Major Antwerp 2022 – 1st
 IEM Dallas - 5th-6th
 BLAST Premier Spring Final 2022 - 5th-6th
 Roobet Cup 2022 - 2nd
 IEM Cologne 2022 - 1st
 SteelSeries Nova Invitational - 1st
 BLAST Premier Fall Groups 2022 - 4th-6th
 ESL Pro League Season 16 - 5th-8th
 IEM Road to Rio 2022: European RMR A - 1st
 IEM Rio Major 2022 - 15th-16th 
 BLAST Premier Fall Final 2022 - 2nd
 BLAST Premier World Final 2022 - 3rd-4th
 Born To Be Brave 2022 - 3rd-4th
 GOAT League - 2nd

References

External links
 Player Profile
 Twitch channel

1999 births
Living people
Canadian esports players
Counter-Strike players
Team Liquid
Twitch (service) streamers